Josef Madersperger (* October 6, 1768 in Kufstein; † October 2, 1850 in Vienna) was a tailor. He is one of the inventors of the sewing machine.

Biography 

Josef Madersperger was born in 1768 in Kufstein. In 1790 his father and he relocated to Vienna because his parents' house in Tirol burned down. In 1807 he began development of the sewing machine, spending all his savings and leisure time. In 1814 he presented his first sewing machine, which imitated a human hand. Madersperger did not commercialize the 1815 granted privilege which expired after 3 years. By 1823 he was registered as a "former" middle-class tailor.

After several unsuccessful attempts to improve the sewing machine, in 1839 he built a machine imitating the weaving process using the chain stitch. Madersperger was out of money, so he could not set up a factory. He donated the prototype to the Imperial–royal Polytechnical Institute (the predecessor of the TU Wien). In 1841 he received a bronze medal from the :de:Niederösterreichischer Gewerbeverein.
 
Madersperger died on 2 October 1850, staying with his wife for only 3 months in Vienna's almshouse. He is buried in a common grave at the St. Marx Cemetery. Vienna's tailors guild erected a crucifix made of cast iron, and continues to maintain the grave.

In his honour, 1933 a memorial was presented to the public in the Resselpark at Karlsplatz. Streets in Vienna, Linz and Innsbruck got his name. The almshouse was replaced 1955-57 by a community-subsidized tenement building. A memorial tablet commemorates Madersperger. The lodgers call the building Madersperger-Hof

External links
 
 Bezirksmuseum Landstraße - Josef Madersperger, being a Landstraßer against his will
 The Madersperger Memorial in Vienna A Video about 3 unsuccessful inventors of Vienna (the stories about Siegfried Marcus don't claim to be right in a historical sense ).

Austrian inventors
People from Kufstein
Businesspeople from Vienna
1768 births
1850 deaths
Austrian tailors